Trent Vale is a village located on the western outskirts of Stoke-on-Trent in England. It is bordered on the south by Hanford, and both villages are separated by the A500. To the west is Clayton, whilst the north is Newcastle-under-Lyme. The south east is Oakhill, while Penkhull is to the north east of the village. The appropriate ward on Stoke-on-Trent MBC is called 'Springfields and Trent Vale'. The population of this ward at the 2011 census was 6,816.

The village is home to the Clayton Wood Training Ground, owned by Stoke City FC. Employment is provided locally by the Royal Stoke University Hospital (sited midway between the centres of Trent Vale and Newcastle-under-Lyme), Premier Foods bakery and Tesco to the north.

Trent Vale has a church called St John the Evangelist Church, Trent Vale erected in the early Gothic style in 1843.  The architect was Philip Wooton.

The main road of the area is the A34, which runs through the village. It connects Trent Vale to Hanford to the South and Newcastle-under-Lyme to the North.

References

Villages in Staffordshire